Gordon Rigby (August 7, 1897 – July 11, 1975) was an American screenwriter. He wrote for more than 40 films between 1921 and 1948. He was born and died in Los Angeles.

Partial filmography

 What Love Will Do (1921)
 Hearts Aflame (1923)
 Dark Stairways (1924)
 Adventure (1925)
 The Blue Eagle (1926)
 Black Paradise (1926)
 The Family Upstairs (1926)
 Honesty – The Best Policy (1926)
 Rustling for Cupid (1926)
 Whispering Wires (1926)
 The Frontiersman (1927)
 Nevada (1927)
 The Grain of Dust (1928)
 The Toilers (1928)
 Tiger Rose (1929)
 The Woman I Love (1929)
 Mammy (1930)
 Under a Texas Moon (1930)
 Song of the Flame (1930)
 Happy Landing (1934)
 The Wrong Road (1937)
 Flight into Nowhere (1938)
 The Strange Case of Dr. Meade (1938)
 Reformatory (1938)
Whispering Enemies (1939)
 Trapped in the Sky (1939)
 Sing, Dance, Plenty Hot (1948)

External links

1897 births
1975 deaths
American male screenwriters
20th-century American male writers
20th-century American screenwriters